Zərigümaco (also, Zəriküməco and Zärigümäco) is a village and municipality in the Lerik Rayon of Azerbaijan.  It has a population of 517.  The municipality consists of the villages of Zərigümaco and Qışlaq.

References 

Populated places in Lerik District